David Harvard Lawrence XVII is an American television and film actor, voice talent, network radio host, Internet entrepreneur, podcaster, demo producer, teacher and author, best known for his role as The Puppetmaster on NBC's sci-fi series Heroes. He was also the host of the daily The David Lawrence Show and weekend Online Tonight, both nationally syndicated radio talk shows that revolved around pop culture and the high-tech lifestyle.

The "XVII" in his name was a way for Lawrence to distinguish himself from previous David Lawrences already registered with SAG. At the time, he was the 17th David Lawrence listed on IMDb, and appended the number to his name upon his own registry.

Acting
Lawrence's appearances on network television include playing a Serbian doctor opposite Dennis Haysbert in the CBS series The Unit, created by David Mamet; a car wash manager on another CBS series, CSI; a rock and roll wannabe on TBS's Frank TV with Frank Caliendo; and as one of the eponymous "villains" on NBC's Heroes. The Heroes role, that of puppetmaster Eric Doyle (one of the 12 escaped villains), was introduced in Volume 3, "Heroes: Villains" in Episode 2, "The Butterfly Effect". The character began a multi episode arc in Episode 5, "Angels and Monsters". Lawrence has also played the role as the station manager in Goodnight Burbank, Charles Bukowski in the musical Bukowsical!, El Gallo in The Fantasticks, as well as parts in The Children's Hour, The Good Doctor, Born Yesterday, The Fall of the House of Usher and the role of Barry Champlain in Talk Radio. He has performed on stage at the Kennedy Center for the Performing Arts. With director Bob Pondillo PhD, Lawrence played Wallace in the short film My Name Is Wallace Lawrence also was executive producer of My Name Is Wallace. In early 2009, he appeared in an episode of the BBC reality program Beat the Boss, in which his team designed a cheesecake. In 2010, Lawrence portrayed a taxi cab driver in the sixth season of Lost, and in 2011, he guest starred in the NBC comedy action series Chuck. He is also in the Fox series The Finder and TNT series Perception.

Radio broadcast history
Lawrence was heard on the radio for nearly 35 years on stations: WMAL, WMZQ and WRQX/Washington DC, WGAR, WGCL, WDMT/Cleveland, KC101/New Haven, WTAE/Pittsburgh and WNCI and WLVQ/Columbus. He is a founding member and former executive producer of the radio comedy ensemble, The American Comedy Network. He wrote the best-selling Learn HTML on The Macintosh, the first web design book created exclusively for Macintosh users. He was the anchor and executive producer of the music show, The Net Music Countdown where one of his net unknown artists was Megaphone.

Podcasting
Lawrence has been involved in podcasting since the inception. He holds the title of 'first podcaster' since he has been sending audio to subscribers via the internet since 1994 when he started the 'Personal Netcast'. David does voiceover work and speaks at events, including the NAB and the Portable Media Expo. David developed ShowTaxi, a subscription management for premium podcasters. He is also the host of a premium podcast called "Patrick Tucker's Secrets of Screen Acting: The Podcast."

Voice work
Lawrence is the voice of America Online's customer service lines, and the voice of more than 1500 other interactive voice response telephone systems. Lawrence also wrote and produced the radio programs for the video game Saints Row. In 2007, he started his Demos2GoGo, his own voiceover demo reel business. Starting on November 18, 2010, he did guest announcing for The Price Is Right, as he is a personal friend of host Drew Carey.

Commentator
Lawrence makes regular appearances as an industry commentator on TechTV, CNN, FOX, CBS, MSNBC and Tribune broadcasting outlets as well as the CBC and the BBC, where he is on BBC Radio 5 Live’s Up All Night.

Filmography

References

External links
 The David Lawrence Show
 sotto voce film works
 My Name is Wallace
 Demos2GoGo
 Secrets of Screen Acting
 Saint's Row Credits
 

Living people
Place of birth missing (living people)
Year of birth missing (living people)
American atheists
American male film actors
American radio personalities
American male voice actors